Joseph Coelho is a British poet and children's book author who was elected Children's Laureate in 2022.

Early life and education 
Coelho grew up in a tower block in Roehampton, where he was the son of a single parent. He became interested in poetry when Jean "Binta" Breeze visited his school whilst Coelho was in sixth form. He studied  A-Levels in Theatre Studies, English, Chemistry, History and an A/S in Archaeology. Coelho was an undergraduate student in archaeology at University College London. During his undergraduate studies he directed plays at UCL, after which he took various jobs, including working at Camden Council.

Career 
Coelho started performing poetry with performance poetry organisation Apples and Snakes in 2002, performing on the London Poetry Scene. Coelho has a long history in theatre both on stage and behind the scenes, which begun as a youth at Group 64 in Putney. After University Coelho worked with many companies behind the scenes including, The Lyric Theatre Hammersmith, The Unicorn Theatre, Half Moon Theatre, Talawa Theatre Company, Oily Cart, and Theatre Centre. 

Coelho is also a playwright and has written plays for:

Wordpepper Theatre / Half Moon Theatre - Pop-Up Flashback & The PoetryJoe Show

Polka Theatre - Goldilocks and the Three Bears Co-written with Jonathon Lloyd

Half Moon Theatre - Fairytales Gone Bad: Grannylocks / The Monstrous Duckling

Half Moon Theatre - Fairytales Gone Bad: Zombie-rella / Blood Red Hood

Unicorn Theatre - Bye Bye Planet Earth

Islington Community Theatre - Chicken Shop

The Spark Childrens Festival - Tree Child 

Pied Piper Theatre Company - Robin's Winter Adventure, Co-Written with Tina Williams, 

The Little Angel Theatre - The Wishing Tree

Tutti Frutti Productions - Jack Frost and The Search For Winter

Before being published Coelho worked extensively in schools engaging young people with literacy through the medium of poetry running session through Performance Poetry Organisation Apples and Snakes, The Poetry Society, Creative Partnerships. Coelho often runs CPD sessions with teachers sharing ways to engage young people with poetry. 

At the London Book Fair in 2012 Coelho met Janetta Otter-Barry, the founder of Otter-Barry books. This interaction launched Coelho's career as an author and published poet. In 2014 Coelho published Werewolf Club Rules, a poetry anthology which was awarded the Centre for Literacy in Primary Poetry Award. Coelho's second independent collection, Overheard in a Tower Block, was shortlisted for the Centre for Literacy in Primary Poetry Award in 2018. Coelho has written over 20 books for young people spanning picture books, middle-grade and YA.  Coelho's debut picture book Luna Loves Library day with Fiona Lumbers was nominated for the 2018 Kate Greenaway Medal and Chosen as one of the Nation’s top 25 stories to share by World Book Day UK. Coelho's debut YA verse novel, The Girl Who Became A Tree was shortlisted for the CILIP Carnegie Medal and the CILIP Kate Greenaway Medal and received a Special Mention for the 2021 Bologna Ragazzi Poetry Award.

Coelho is a children's author and poet who is committed to making the reading and writing of poetry accessible to all. As part of these efforts, in 2018 he created resources for Key Stage 1 and Key Stage 2 students on understanding poetry. The resources included a series of videos explaining the different formats of poetry, how to perform poetry and how to interpret poetry.

In 2022 Coelho was appointed the Children's Laureate. He has said that poetry was often what people turned to in times of need, “because we instinctively know, deep down in our core, that poetry transcends”. He looks to improve diversity amongst the authors and illustrators on UK bookshelves. As part of his tenure as Children's Laureate he will focus on various different projects, Poetry Prompts, Bookmaker Like You and the Library Marathon. He launched Poetry Prompts, a set of online writing activities to inspire people to write their own poetry. Additionally, he started a programme called Bookmaker Like You, which celebrates the authors, illustrators and publishers who underpin book creation. As part of the Library Marathon Coelho will visit a library in every local authority across the United Kingdom.

Coelho writes children's books for all ages from Picture Books to YA, including:

Picture Books

 Luna Loves with illustrator Fiona Lumbers (Nominated for the 2018 Greenaway Medal)
 Luna Loves Art with Illustrator Fiona Lumbers
 Luna Loves Dance with illustrator Fiona Lumbers
 Luna Loves World Book Day with Illustrator Fiona Lumbers
 The Hairdo That Got Away will Illustrator Fiona Lumbers
 If All The World Were… with illustrator Allison Colpoys (winner of the Independent Bookshop Week Book Award 2019)
 My Beautiful Voice With Illustrator Allison Colpoys (Winner of the Indie Book Awards 2022)
 No Longer Alone with Illustrator Robyn Wilson-Owen
 Our Tower with illustrator Richard Johnson
 Thank You with illustrator Sam Usher

Middle-Grade

Fairy Tales Gone Bad - Zombierella, illustrated by Freya Hartas

Fairy Tales Gone Bad - Frankenstiltskin, illustrated by Freya Hartas

Fairy Tales Gone Bad - Creeping Beauty illustrated, by Freya Hartas

Run, Friend , Run! Illustrated by Davide Ortu

Short-Stories

Hope Hunter - Featured in The Book Of Hopes  Ed. Katherine Rundell

Amelia St-Claire and the Long Armed Killer - Featured in Happy Here, introduced by Sharna Jackson

Poetry

Werewolf Club Rules, illustrated by John O'leary (winner of the CLPE CLIPPA Poetry Award 2015)

Overheard In A Tower Block, illustrated by Kate Milner (Long-Listed for the 2018 Carnegie medal, Shortlisted for the CLPE Poetry Award 2018, Long-listed for the 2019 UKLA Book Awards)

A Year Of Nature Poems, Illustrated by Kelly Louise Judd

Poems Aloud, illustrated by Daniel Gray-Barnett

Smile Out Loud, illustrated by Daniel Gray-Barnett

Blow A Kiss Catch A Kiss, illustrated by Nicola Killen

How To Write Poems, illustrated by Matt Robertson

YA

The Girl Who Became a Tree (shortlisted for the CILIP Carnegie Medal and the CILIP Kate Greenaway Medal, Special Mention for the 2021 Bologna Ragazzi Poetry Award)

The Boy Lost In The Maze, Illustrated by Kate Milner

References 

People from Roehampton
Alumni of University College London
English children's writers
English poets
English male dramatists and playwrights
British Children's Laureate
Year of birth missing (living people)
Living people